Vitesse Dallas is an indoor soccer team in the USA, founded in 2007. The team is a member of the Premier Arena Soccer League. Vitesse has won two PASL-Premier Championships (2008/09 and 2011/12).

The team plays its home games at Arlington Indoor Center in the city of Grand Prairie, Texas, 14 miles south-west of downtown Dallas. The club's colors are red and royal.

Year-by-year

Honors
2009 PASL-Premier Winter National Champions
2012 PASL-Premier Winter National Champions

Coaches
  Roy Ramos 2008–present

Stadia
 Arlington Indoor Center, Grand Prairie, Texas 2008–present

See also
Vitesse Arnhem, a Dutch soccer team

References

External links
Official website

2007 establishments in Texas
Premier Arena Soccer League teams
Soccer clubs in Dallas
Women's Premier Soccer League teams
Soccer clubs in Texas